The 1996 Giro di Lombardia was the 90th edition of the Giro di Lombardia cycle race and was held on 19 October 1996. The race started in Varese and finished in Bergamo. The race was won by Andrea Tafi of the Mapei team.

General classification

References

1996
Giro di Lombardia
Giro di Lombardia
Giro Di Lombardia
October 1996 sports events in Europe